Swain is an English surname derived from the Old Norse personal name Sveinn (Sven, Sweyn), from an Old Norse word meaning a youth or young man, and hence a young male attendant or servant (compare in meaning Old English 'cniht' = knight; German 'Knecht'). There are a number of variations in the spelling of the surname Swain, including Swaine, Swainne, and Swayne.

From this word meaning boy, young male or servant, are derived:
 The noun swain, meaning a rustic lover or boyfriend, cf. the numerous examples in Shakespeare's work, including his lyric, "[w]ho is Sylvia, what is she that all our Swains commend her" (from The Two Gentlemen of Verona) and "O God! methinks it were a happy life, To be no better than a homely swain;" (from King Henry VI)
 There are also specific nautical words involving swain: boatswain (literally "young man in charge of a boat") which can be seen in Shakespeare's The Tempest, and coxswain.

The American Old West outlaw John Wesley Hardin used various aliases with Swain as the surname. 

People with the name include:
 Bennie Swain, American professional basketball player
 Brennan Swain, American television star and winner of The Amazing Race
 Brett Swain (disambiguation)
 Carol M. Swain (born 1954), American retired professor of political science and law and author
 Daniel Swain (born 1983) or Danny!, American rap performer and record producer 
 David Lowry Swain (1801–1868), governor of North Carolina
 Diana Swain, Canadian television journalist
 Dominique Swain, American actress
 Freddie Swain (born 1998), American National Football League player
 George Swain (disambiguation)
 Gladys Swain, French psychiatrist and writer
 Jack Swain, English footballer
 James Swain, American author of mystery novels and non-fiction magic books
 John Swain (born 1959), American National Football League player
 Jon Swain (born 1948), British journalist and writer
 Joseph Swain (disambiguation)
 Joshua Swain Jr. (1804–1866), American state senator
 Kenny Swain (born 1952), English footballer
 Leonard Swain, American Congregational minister
 Louisa Ann Swain (1801–1880), the first woman in America to vote in a general election
 Mack Swain (1876–1935), American actor and vaudevillian
 Margaret Swain (1909–2002), English embroidery and textile historian
 Paul J. Swain (1943-2022), American Roman Catholic bishop
 Paul Swain (politician) New Zealand politician
 Richard Swain, New Zealand rugby league footballer of the 1990s and 2000s
 Robert Swain (disambiguation)
 Ryan Swain (presenter), English television and radio presenter and comedian
 Shurlee Swain, Australian social welfare historian
 Thomas Swain (1911–1979), British politician and Member of Parliament
 Tony Swain (disambiguation)
 William Swain (disambiguation)

See also
 Senator Swain (disambiguation)
 Swain (disambiguation)
 McSwain (disambiguation)
 Swaim, a surname

External links
 Etymology on-line

English-language surnames
Surnames from given names